Străjescu is a family and place name in Romania and  Moldova.

 Ioan Străjescu (1833–1873), Romanian politician and founding member of the Romanian Academy
 Mihai Străjescu, an MP elected in the 1990 Moldavian Supreme Soviet election
 Străjescu, a village in Garoafa Commune, Vrancea County, Romania